The following is a list of awards and nominations received by American actor Danny Glover.

Glover is an actor of film, television and theatre. He has received four Primetime Emmy Award nominations for his performances in 
Mandela (1988), Loneseome Dove (1989), Fallen Angels (1996), and Freedom Song (2000). He also earned two Screen Actors Guild Award nominations for Outstanding Actor in a Miniseries or Movie for Fallen Angels (2000) and for Outstanding Ensemble Cast in a Motion Picture for Dreamgirls (2006). In 1991 he earned an Independent Spirit Award for his performance in To Sleep with Anger.

In 2021, it was announced by the Board of the Academy of Motion Picture Arts and Sciences that he would receive the Jean Hersholt Humanitarian Award for "[his] decades-long advocacy for justice and human rights reflects his dedication to recognizing our shared humanity on and off the screen".

Major associations

Academy Awards

Emmy Awards

Grammy Awards

Screen Actors Guild Awards

Independent Spirit Awards

Miscellaneous awards

CableACE Award

NAACP Image Awards

MTV Movie Award

Women in Film Crystal Awards

Festival awards

References 

Glover, Danny